Nazzareno Celestini (born April 14, 1914 in Rome) was an Italian professional football player.

He played 3 games in 3 seasons in the Serie A for A.S. Roma.

1914 births
Year of death missing
Italian footballers
Serie A players
A.S. Roma players
Association football midfielders